Ruffieu is a commune  in the Ain department in eastern France.

Population

References

See also
Communes of the Ain department

Communes of Ain
Ain communes articles needing translation from French Wikipedia